The Yin & The Yang is the second solo studio album by American rapper Cappadonna. It was released on April 3, 2001 via Razor Sharp/Epic Records. Recording sessions took place at Studio 57 and at 36 Chambers Studios in New York, at the Hit Factory Criteria in Miami, at Krosswire Studios in Atlanta, and at Cheffield Studios in Baltimore. Production was handled by Neonek, Goldfinghaz, Agallah, Inspectah Deck, Jermaine Dupri and True Master. It features guest appearances from Agallah, Crunch, Culture, Da Brat, Ghostface Killah, Jamie Sommers, Jermaine Dupri, Killah Priest, Neonek, Raekwon, Shyheim and Timbo King.

The album debuted at number 51 on the Billboard 200 and number 19 on the Top R&B/Hip-Hop Albums chart in the United States.

Track listing

Notes
Track 11 is unlisted on physical versions of the album.

Sample credits
Track 1 contains excerpts from "Lagrimas" written by Sergio George and Huey Dunbar and performed by Dark Latin Groove
Track 5 contains a sample from "Love Is the Message" written by Kenneth Gamble and Leon Huff and performed by MFSB

Charts

References

External links

2001 albums
Cappadonna albums
Epic Records albums
Albums produced by Agallah
Albums produced by True Master
Albums produced by Jermaine Dupri